The Ilustrados ("erudite", "learned" or "enlightened ones") constituted the Filipino educated class during the Spanish colonial period in the late 19th century. Elsewhere in New Spain (of which the Philippines were part), the term gente de razón carried a similar meaning.

They were middle class Filipinos, many of whom were educated in Spain and exposed to Spanish liberal and European nationalist ideals. The Ilustrado class was composed of native-born intellectuals and cut across ethnolinguistic and racial lines—Indios, Insulares and Mestizos, among others—and sought reform through "a more equitable arrangement of both political and economic power" under Spanish tutelage.

Stanley Karnow, in his In Our Image: America's Empire in the Philippines, referred to the Ilustrados as the "rich Intelligentsia" because many were the children of  wealthy landowners. They were key figures in the development of Filipino nationalism.

History

The most prominent Ilustrados were Graciano López Jaena, Marcelo H. del Pilar, Mariano Ponce, Antonio Luna and José Rizal, the Philippine national hero.  Rizal's novels Noli Me Tangere ("Touch Me Not") and El Filibusterismo ("The Subversive") "exposed to the world the injustices imposed on Filipinos under the Spanish colonial regime".

In the beginning, Rizal and his fellow Ilustrados preferred not to win independence from Spain, instead they yearned legal equality for both Peninsulares and natives—Indios, Insulares, and mestizos, among others—in the economic reforms demanded by the Ilustrados were that "the Philippines be represented in the Cortes and be considered as a province of Spain" and "the secularization of the parishes."

However, in 1872, nationalist sentiment grew strongest, when three Filipino priests, José Burgos, Mariano Gomez and friar Jacinto Zamora, who had been charged with leading a military mutiny at an arsenal in Cavite, near Manila, were executed by the Spanish authorities. The event and "other repressive acts outraitings and activities, Rizal was executed on December 30, 1896. His execution propelled the Ilustrados .  This also prompted unity among the Ilustrados and Andrés Bonifacio's radical Katipunan.  Philippine policies by the United States reinforced the dominant position of the Ilustrados within Filipino society. Friar estates were sold to the Ilustrados and most government positions were offered to them.

See also
 Spanish Filipino
Filipino Mestizos
Mestizos de Sangley (Chinese Mestizos)
 Assimilados
 Ladino people
 Black Ladino
 Évolués
 Affranchis
 Emancipados
Filipino nationalism
Spanish language in the Philippines
Philippine literature in Spanish
 Principalía
 Gente de razón

References

Notes

Sources
Republic of the Philippines, Microsoft Corporation, Encarta.MSN.com, 2007 ( (Archived 2009-10-31), retrieved on: August 1, 2007
Exiles, Motherland and Social Change, Asian and Pacific Migration Journal (Bibliography), Volume 8, Issue 1-2, SMC.org.ph, (undated), retrieved on: August 1, 2007
Owen, Norman G., Compadre Colonialism: Studies in the Philippines Under American Rule, A Review by Theodore Friend, The Journal of Asian Studies, Vol. 32, No. 1 (Nov., 1972), pp. 224-226, JSTOR.org, 2007, retrieved on: August 1, 2007
Majul, Cesar A. The Political and Constitutional Ideas of the Philippine Revolution, A Review by R. S. Milne, Pacific Affairs, Vol. 42, No. 1 (Spring, 1969), pp. 98-99, JSTOR.org, 2007, retrieved on: August 1, 2007
Proclamation of Philippine Independence and the Birth of the Philippine Republic, The Philippine History Site, OpManong.SSC.Hawaii.edu (undated) , retrieved on: August 1, 2007
Rossabi, Amy. The Colonial Roots of Civil Procedure in the Philippines, Volume 11, Number 1, Fall 1997, The Journal of Asian Law, Columbia.edu, retrieved on: August 1, 2007
Filipino Nationalism, AngelFire.com (undated), retrieved on: August 1, 2007
Veneracion, Jaime B., Ph. D. (Professor of History, University of the Philippines and Visiting Professor, BSU), Rizal's Madrid: The Roots of the Ilustrado Concept of Autonomy, Diyaryo Bulakenya, Bahay Saliksikan ng Bulakan (Center for Bulacan Studies), Geocities.com, April 4, 2003, retrieved on: August 1, 2007
Philippine History, Philippine Children's Foundation, PhilippineChildrensFoundation.org, 2005, retrieved on: August 1, 2007

History of the Philippines (1565–1898)
Philippine Revolution
Latin American caste system
Captaincy General of the Philippines